Umberto Battist (6 September 1939 – 16 April 2021) was a French politician. A member of the Socialist Party, he served on the National Assembly from 1981 to 1986 and again from 1988 to 1993.

References

1939 births
2021 deaths
French politicians
Deputies of the 7th National Assembly of the French Fifth Republic
Deputies of the 9th National Assembly of the French Fifth Republic
Socialist Party (France) politicians
People from Nord (French department)